Andrea Barbiani (1708–1779) was an Italian painter of the 18th century, mainly active in Ravenna and Rimini. He painted in the style of Cesare Pronti. He was the nephew of the painter Giovanni Battista Barbiani.

Works
The Four Evangelists in the vault of the cathedral of Ravenna.
La Madonna col bambino e Santi (Saint Mary with her Baby and Saints), Oil on canvas, Forlì, Pinacoteca civica.
Altarpiece, Santa Maria del Suffragio, Ravenna

References

1708 births
1779 deaths
18th-century Italian painters
Italian male painters
Italian Baroque painters
18th-century Italian male artists